Arkansas's 6th congressional district was a congressional district for the United States House of Representatives in Arkansas from 1893 to 1963.

List of members representing the district

References 
 Election Statistics 1920-present Clerk of the House of Representatives

 Congressional Biographical Directory of the United States 1774–present

Former congressional districts of the United States
06
1893 establishments in Arkansas
1963 disestablishments in Arkansas